Ali Oune is a small town located in Ali Sabieh Region of Djibouti.

Overview
Nearby towns and villages include Holhol (26 km), Damerjog (14 km), Goubetto (18 km) and Ali Sabieh (57 km).

External links
Seabee Commander Visits Ali Oune
U.S. Ambassador to Djibouti Visits Ali Oune Medical Clinic Site
Satellite map at geographic.org

Populated places in Djibouti
Ali Sabieh Region